Marcus "Marshay" Kentrill Green (born January 14, 1986) is a professional gridiron football defensive back. He was signed by the Arizona Cardinals as an undrafted free agent in 2010, spending two seasons with the club before joining the Indianapolis Colts for another two seasons. He played college football at Ole Miss. Green was the 2009 Defensive MVP in the nationally televised Cotton Bowl. Green signed with the Saskatchewan Roughriders on May 20, 2014.

References

External links
 Saskatchewan Roughriders bio 
 Ole Miss Rebels bio

1986 births
Living people
American football cornerbacks
Ole Miss Rebels football players
Arizona Cardinals players
Indianapolis Colts players
Saskatchewan Roughriders players